The Northern Textile and Allied Workers' Union was a trade union representing cotton factory workers in northern Lancashire in England.

The union was founded in 1886 as the Accrington District Card and Blowing Room Operatives' and Ring Spinners' Association.  That same year, it was a founding constituent of the Cardroom Amalgamation and, although it was suspended for not paying dues in 1891, it was soon readmitted, with its secretary Anthony Eidsforth assuming a prominent role in the amalgamation.

By 1887, the Accrington Association had attracted members in various nearby towns, and restructured itself as a federal organisation named the North East Lancashire Card and Blowing Room Operatives' and Ring Spinners' Association.  In 1891, its affiliates included Accrington, Burnley, Church, Darwen, Haslingden and Oswaldtwistle.  These affiliates changed in number repeatedly over the years, and its membership varied from 2,000 in 1892, to 500 in 1904, then to a peak of 4,000 in 1920, before falling back to 1,566 in 1936.

In 1961, the North Lancashire Card, Blowing Room and Ring Spinners' Association merged into the North East Lancashire Association, which renamed itself as the "Northern Textile and Allied Workers' Union".

In 1981 it absorbed the Accrington, Church and Ostwaldtwistle Weavers', Winders' and Warpers', etc., Association. It merged with the Transport and General Workers' Union in 1984.

References

Defunct trade unions of the United Kingdom
Cotton industry trade unions
Textile industry of the United Kingdom
Transport and General Workers' Union amalgamations
Trade unions established in 1886
Trade unions disestablished in 1984
Trade unions based in Lancashire